Made You Look may refer to:

"Made You Look" (Nas song), 2002
Made You Look: A True Story About Fake Art, a 2020 documentary
"Made You Look" (Meghan Trainor song), 2022